Jack Conley may refer to:
 Jack Conley (actor) (born 1958), American actor
 Jack Conley (English footballer) (1920–1991), English footballer
 Jack Conley (Australian rules footballer) (1920–2008)
 Jack Conley (American football), American football coach in the United States

See also
John Conley (disambiguation)